Brandon Bonifacio (born 29 June 1989) is a Canadian  soccer player who plays for UBC Thunderbirds.

Career
He began as a midfielder with Vancouver Selects, Provincial All-Star Teams and joined 2006 in the youth system of SC Cambuur of the Dutch Eerste Divisie. After advancing to SC Cambuur's professional team for one year and half he went on loan to FC Zwolle. A short time later he made a decision to return to Canada to attend the University of British Columbia rather than continue with professional soccer.

International career
He is former member of the Canada U-20 men's national soccer team and has five games played for the team. He was also voted second for Canadian U20 Player of the Year.

References

External links
 Official Site

1989 births
Living people
SC Cambuur players
Canadian expatriate soccer players
Canadian expatriate sportspeople in the Netherlands
Canadian soccer players
Canadian people of Croatian descent
Canadian sportspeople of Italian descent
Expatriate footballers in the Netherlands
Association football midfielders
Soccer players from Vancouver
UBC Thunderbirds soccer players
Canada men's youth international soccer players
2009 CONCACAF U-20 Championship players
21st-century Canadian people